"Pilot" is the pilot episode of the British comedy series Tracey Breaks the News starring comedian Tracey Ullman. The series was commissioned by the BBC for BBC One. It is thematically inspired by the aftermath 2017 United Kingdom general election, as well as the one year anniversary of the Brexit vote, and was recorded (and expected to air) shortly thereafter. The special is a reformatted version of Tracey Ullman's Show.  "Tracey Breaks the News" is the second special Ullman has done for British television; her first since 1993's Tracey Ullman: A Class Act, and her fifth overall. The show aired on 23 June.

The success of the special led to the order and creation of the series Tracey Breaks the News.

Premise
The show opens with Prime Minister Theresa May practicing her speech in front of her husband Philip. Russian headquarters try to fix a malfunctioning Melania Bot. Schooling Eastern European workers how to act like British builders post-Brexit. Angela Merkel Skypes with Donald Trump. Has the BBC coverage of Jeremy Corbyn been biased? The Melania Bot is flown back to Russia for maintenance. Voluntary mandatory reeducation program at Labour Party headquarters. A man tries to rent his battle bus. Theresa May is feeling the effects of the recent election result. Polling the pollsters. "When do we get our say?" Not Everyone Thinks Exactly the Same As You Do support group. Nicola Sturgeon is confronted by rival Ruth Davidson on the links. A police constable discusses filming an abusive incident in portrait mode. Seeing an apartment you have no plans of moving into. A woman has voting fatigue. Liberal Democrats headquarters has become much, much smaller. Tracey confronts a Twitter troll. Theresa and Philip are awakened by a phone call from Arlene Foster with more DUP demands.

Cast

 Tracey Ullman
 Chizzy Akudolu as Various
 Gemma Arrowsmith as Various
 Jake Bailey
 Rhona Cameron as Ruth Davidson
 Dominique Moore as Various
 Jade Ewen
 Tony Gardner as Various
 William Hartley
 Laurence Howarth as Various
 Katherine Jakeways as Various
 Georgia Maskery as Various
 Mabel McKeown as Herself
 Olivia Morgan as Various
 Carlotta Morelli as Melania Trump
 Aaron Neil as Various
 Sue Elliott-Nicholls as Various
 Laurence Rickard as Philip May
 Dan Skinner as Various
 Samantha Spiro as Birgit
 Tony Way as Various
 Anthony Atamanuik as Donald Trump

Development and production
After thirty successful years in the United States, British comedian Tracey Ullman returned to the BBC with the sketch comedy series Tracey Ullman's Show. The show features Ullman performing an eclectic cast of characters, some real-life, others totally original. The show's political and celebrity impersonations, such as her take on a devious Judi Dench, a vain Angela Merkel, and Nicola Sturgeon reimagined as a Bond-type villain were lauded by critics.

Whilst promoting the first and second series of Tracey Ullman's Show, Ullman repeatedly implored for the award-winning British satirical puppet show, Spitting Image to return, feeling that television needed a satirical voice now more than ever. "I think they did a Spitting Image puppet of me once. I didn't think it was that great. She only made one appearance!"

Whilst promoting Tracey Ullman's Show the United States, Ullman spoke about possibly impersonating Melania Trump. Speaking to People: "'I'll let Alec Baldwin do [Trump]. It's not like I'm going to try that one now. No! I'd like to do Melania when things have calmed down a little [...] I think I can do it because she’s from countries that I know. I think I can do it, I think I try,' she delivers in a uncannily Melania-esque accent."

On 26 May 2017, the BBC announced that it had ordered a new topical half hour Tracey Ullman special, Tracey Breaks the News for BBC One. The show is inspired by and due to air shortly after the 2017 British general election. Impersonations expected are Angela Merkel, Nicola Sturgeon, as well as Ullman's first take on Prime Minister Theresa May and Melania Trump. Like Tracey Ullman's Show, it will feature a mix of famous and everyday people all reacting to the aftermath of the general election along with the anniversary of the Brexit vote. It will include the reaction of not only the UK, but Europeans and Russians. "I'm excited the BBC has asked me to make a show at this time. We've decided to shake it up with a more topical format because things move so fast these days it's like every 10 minutes I'm voting for something. There's never been a better time to be imitating world famous political women, and I admire and thank them all: Angela Merkel, Nicola Sturgeon, and my home girl newbie Theresa May. I can't wait to get stuck in - thanks to the BBC and my brilliant team. It really is a privilege."

Two days before filming the second series of Tracey Ullman's Show, the Brexit vote occurred causing the show's writers to do last minute rewrites for many of the series' Angela Merkel sketches. Ullman didn't have time to prepare an impersonation of Theresa May as David Cameron was still Prime Minister (although she is mentioned by Merkel in the show's second series finale). Ullman stated her intention on The One Show that if she got a third series, she would have to do May.

Reception
Tracey Breaks the News debuted with a total of 2.4 million viewers; it added a further 1.8 million during its encore showing, bringing the total to 4.2 million.

References

External links
 

2017 British television episodes
BBC high definition shows
BBC television comedy
British satirical television shows
British television series premieres
Cultural depictions of Angela Merkel
Cultural depictions of Donald Trump
English-language television shows
Tracey Ullman